XXVI Brigade, Royal Field Artillery was a brigade of the Royal Field Artillery which served in the First World War.

It was originally formed with 116th, 117th and 118th Batteries, and attached to 1st Division. In August 1914, it mobilised and was sent to the Continent with the British Expeditionary Force, where it saw service with 1st Division until January 1917. 118th Battery left the brigade in May 1915, and 40th (Howitzer) Battery joined in May 1916. From January 1917 onwards, it was used as an army-level brigade.

External links
Royal Field Artillery Brigades
1st Division Order of Battle

Notes

References

Royal Field Artillery brigades
Artillery units and formations of World War I